Centro Atlético Sport Club (usually called Centro Atlético) was a Venezuelan professional football club. The club has won four First Division titles in the amateur era. The club is based in Caracas.

Honours
Primera División Venezolana: 4
Winners (4): 1922, 1924, 1926, 1930
Runner-up (7): 1921, 1923, 1927, 1928, 1931, 1936, 1946

External links
Centro Atlético Sport Club 

Football clubs in Venezuela
Football clubs in Caracas
1915 establishments in Venezuela
Association football clubs established in 1915
Defunct football clubs in Venezuela